Drganja Sela is a village in the Municipality of Straža in southeastern Slovenia. The area is part of the historical region of Lower Carniola. The municipality is now included in the Southeast Slovenia Statistical Region. 

The local church is dedicated to Mary, Comforter of the Afflicted and belongs to the Parish of Vavta Vas. It is a medieval building that was restyled in the Baroque in the early 18th century.

References

External links
Drganja Sela at Geopedia

Populated places in the Municipality of Straža